A bottle glorifier is a display that is designed to fit on a bottle, typically with a cut-out area to hold the bottle in position.

Bottle glorifiers can be made of acrylic, wood, stainless steel, plastic, or polyresin. New lighting technology brings LED and electroluminescent illumination options to the display. Most bottle glorifiers are illuminated with LED or fluorescent 
lighting elements. The units can be powered via AC current or by using DC (batteries) although batteries have a short shelf life when illuminating bottle glorifiers. Other options such as rechargeable batteries are available.

Bottle glorifiers are used for all sorts of marketing expressions but mostly in B2C business.
Decorative arts